Shadows in Blue is a remix album by Penal Colony, released on February 27, 1995 by Zoth Ommog Records

Track listing

Personnel 
Adapted from the Shadows in Blue liner notes.

Penal Colony
 Jason Hubbard – sampler, programming, drum programming
 Dee Madden – lead vocals, sampler, programming, design, remixing (3)
 Andy Shaw – electric guitar, backing vocals
 Chris Shinkus – bass guitar, backing vocals, design

Additional musicians
 Rhys Fulber – remixing (2)
 Gary Dassing – remixing (4, 5)
 Bill Leeb – remixing (2)
 Claus Larsen – remixing (1)
 Genesis P-Orridge – remixing (6, 7)
 Larry Thrasher – remixing (6, 7)

Release history

References

External links 
 

1995 remix albums
Penal Colony albums
Zoth Ommog Records albums